Manolis "Manos" Zacharakis (born 10 August 1992) is a Greek professional footballer who last played as a defender, for AE Larissa in the Greek Football League.

Career 
Zacharakis started his career from the youth teams of OFI Crete. On 1 July 2010 he signed a professional contract and moved to the first squad where he managed to play for almost 3 years. On 18 June 2013 he moved to Super League club Panionios. On 31 January 2015 he signed a 2,5 years contract with AE Larissa.

Zacharakis played for Greece National U-21 team, in a friendly game against Austria in 14 November 2012 in Argos.

References

External links
 onsports.gr
 myplayer.gr

1992 births
Living people
Footballers from Chania
Greek footballers
Greece under-21 international footballers
Athlitiki Enosi Larissa F.C. players
Panionios F.C. players
OFI Crete F.C. players
Association football midfielders